Giovanni d'Aragona (1456–1485) (called the Cardinal of Aragona) was an Italian Roman Catholic  cardinal.

Biography

D'Aragona was born in Naples on June 25, 1456, the son of Ferdinand I of Naples and his wife Isabella of Clermont.

He became a protonotary apostolic on July 12, 1465.  On November 10, 1477, he was named apostolic administrator of the see of Taranto, a post he held for the rest of his life.

In the consistory of December 10, 1477, Pope Sixtus IV made him a cardinal deacon.  He received the deaconry of Sant'Adriano al Foro on December 12, 1477.  The pope sent him the red hat in Naples three months later.

He served as apostolic administrator of the see of Badajoz from January 20, 1479 to May 14, 1479.  On April 10, 1479, the pope named him legate a latere to the Kingdom of Hungary; he left Rome for his legation on January 31, 1480 and returned on August 31, 1480.  On January 14, 1480, he opted for the order of cardinal priests and his deaconry of Sant'Adriano al Foro was raised pro illa vice to titulus.

On November 14, 1481, he was named apostolic administrator of the metropolitan see of Cosenza, a post he held for the rest of his life.  He was in Naples from April 23, 1482 until August 30, 1483, when he returned to Rome.  He became apostolic administrator of the metropolitan see of Salerno on January 13, 1483, and of the metropolitan see of Esztergom on December 20, 1483, and held both of those offices until his death as well.

On September 10, 1483, he was named papal legate to Hungary and Germany.  He returned to Rome on August 19, 1484 in order to participate in the papal conclave of 1484 that elected Pope Innocent VIII.

His father, the king of Naples, then named him governor and viceroy of the Province of Bari.  In early October 1485, his father despatched him on a mission to the pope.  He arrived in Rome in the midst of a serious epidemic and soon died of fever on October 17, 1485.  He is buried in Santa Sabina.

References

1456 births
1485 deaths
15th-century Italian cardinals
Clergy from Naples
Sons of kings